Kudanga is a rural locality (a village) in Permasskoye Rural Settlement, Nikolsky District, Vologda Oblast, Russia. The population was 25 as of 2002.

Geography 
Kudanga is located 53 km southwest of Nikolsk (the district's administrative centre) by road. Kalauz is the nearest rural locality.

References 

Rural localities in Nikolsky District, Vologda Oblast